Love to the World is the third studio album by Los Angeles, California -based band, L.T.D., released in 1976 on the A&M label.

Commercial performance
The album peaked at No. 7 on the R&B albums chart. It also reached No. 52 on the Billboard 200. The album features the singles "Love Ballad", which peaked at No. 1 on the Hot Soul Singles chart and No. 20 on the Hot Soul Singles chart, and the title track, which charted at No. 27 on the Hot Soul Singles chart and No. 91 on the Billboard Hot 100.

Track listing

Personnel 
Jeffrey Osborne - Lead and Backing Vocals, Drums, Percussion
Billy Osborne - Clavinet, Organ, Piano, Synthesizer, Lead and Backing Vocals
Jimmie Davis - Clavinet, Electric Piano, Piano, Backing Vocals
Henry Davis - Bass, Backing Vocals
Bernorce Blackman, John McGee - Guitar
Carle Vickers - Flute, Flugelhorn, Soprano Saxophone, Trumpet
Abraham "Onion" Miller - Tenor Saxophone, Backing Vocals
Lorenzo Carnegie - Alto Saxophone, Tenor Saxophone
Toby Wynn - Baritone Saxophone
Jake Riley - Trombone
Robert Santiel - Percussion
Charles Veal - Concertmaster
Barbara Dice, Carolyn Dice, John "Bunky" Butler - Children's Voices (track 7)

Charts
Album

Singles

References

External links
 

1976 albums
L.T.D. (band) albums
Albums produced by the Mizell Brothers
A&M Records albums